Achnafauld is a settlement in the Scottish Highlands, about  northwest of Perth. It is located in the parish of Dull in the council area of Perth and Kinross.

References

Villages in Perth and Kinross